Muro-Ami is a 1999 Filipino adventure drama film directed by Marilou Diaz-Abaya. It stars Cesar Montano as Fredo, a ruthless captain of 150 muro-ami divers, who employ illegal fishing practices, such as pounding and crushing corals to scare fish, driving them towards the nets. It depicts one of the worst forms of child labor in the illegal fishing system.

The film has won 13 out of 14 nominations in the 1999 Metro Manila Film Festival, including Best Picture.

Plot
Fredo (Cesar Montano) is a fisherman who has endured more than his share of hardship in life; his wife and child both perished in a boating accident, and today Fredo approaches each trip to the sea with the angry determination of a man out for revenge. Fredo commands a crew of young people from poor families as he takes his rattletrap ship into the ocean in search of fish that live along the reefs, snaring catch with an illegal netting system. Not all of Fredo's youthful sailors are willing to put up with his abusive arrogance, however, and even his father Dado (Pen Medina) and close friend Botong (Jhong Hilario) have grown weary of Fredo's tirades. Fredo's body is beginning to betray him as well, and as he and his crew damage the sea's reef beds in search of fish, no one is certain how much longer he will be able to continue.

Cast
Cesar Montano as Fredo Obsioma
Pen Medina as Diosdado "Diyos-Dado" Lacar
Jhong Hilario as Botong Maldepena
Amy Austria as Susan Bacor
Rebecca Lusterio as Kalbo Kee
Jerome Sales as Filemon Dolotallas
Teodoro Penaranda Jr. as Tibor Lague
Walter Pacatang as Tibo
Ranilo Boquil as Kokoy
Ariel Estoquia Mijos as Bahoy Ballasabas

Accolades

References

External links

1999 films
Child labour
Films shot in Bohol
Environmental impact of fishing
GMA Pictures films
Philippine adventure films
Philippine drama films
1990s Tagalog-language films
Films directed by Marilou Diaz-Abaya